Anna Austen Lefroy (1793-1872) (Jane-Anna-Elizabeth Austen/Anna Lefroy) was the niece of Jane Austen by her eldest brother James Austen, and a contributor to her life-history via the so-called Lefroy MS.

A keen if amateur writer herself, Anna was the recipient of the most revealing of Austen's letters on literary matters.

Life
Known in family tradition as a naughty child, Anna became a lively, outgoing and changeable adolescent - "quite an Anna with variations" as her Aunt put it (startled by the unexpected cropping of her niece's hair).

At the age of twenty, Anna became engaged to a family connection, Benjamin Lefroy, and despite family opposition the pair were married in 1814. The marriage seems to have been a successful one, and by 1817 the pair had two young daughters, and Anna was apparently expecting again: "Poor Animal, she will be worn out before she is thirty", wrote her Aunt.  The couple had seven children in all, before Anna lost her husband in 1829.

Writings
Niece and aunt had bonded over a love of 'bad' romantic fiction, such as that by Rachel Hunter; and when during her engagement Anna began writing a novel - known as Enthusiasm or Which is the Heroine? - it was natural for her to share it with her aunt.

Anna also tried her hand at continuing an early Austen story called 'Evelyn'; as well as (later) the unfinished Sanditon.

See also
Cassandra Austen

References

External links 
 A. A. L. - A Believer in True Love

1793 births
1872 deaths
Austen family
Austen, Anna